A slater is a tradesperson who works with slate.

Slater may also refer to:

Places
 Slater (crater), an impact crater near the south pole of the Moon

In the United States:
Slater, Colorado
Slater, Iowa
Slater, Kentucky
Slater Township, Cass County, Minnesota
Slater, Missouri
Slater, Ohio
Slater-Marietta, South Carolina
Slater, Wyoming

Other uses
 Slater (surname), a list of people and fictional characters with the surname
 Woodlouse, a crustacean commonly found in old wood and known as a "slater" in some countries
 Slater Menswear, a men's clothing retailer
 USS Slater (DE-766), a Cannon-class destroyer escort of the United States Navy
 Slater determinant, an expression in quantum mechanics
 Slater-type orbitals, functions used in computational chemistry
 "Slater", a song by Tyler, the Creator on the album Wolf
 Slater Jewell-Kemker, American-Canadian filmmaker and climate activist

See also
 Couvreur, French for slater, a surname
 Slatter
 Slayyyter, a stage name of Catherine Slater, a singer from St. Louis, Missouri

Surnames of English origin